John Welsh (born 5 January 1938) is a former Australian rules footballer who played with Essendon in the Victorian Football League (VFL). He later captained Coburg in the Victorian Football Association, was captain-coach of Public Works in the Public Service Association, and coached East Keilor and St Oliver's in the Essendon District Football League.

Notes

External links 		
		

Essendon Football Club past player profile
		
		
		

1938 births
Living people
Australian rules footballers from Victoria (Australia)
Essendon Football Club players
Coburg Football Club players